Stéphanie Ludwig (born 29 November 1972) is a French handball player.

She was born in Casablanca, Morocco. She competed at the 2000 Summer Olympics, when the French team finished 6th.

She was part of the French team that won gold medals at the 2003 World Women's Handball Championship.

References

1972 births
Living people
Sportspeople from Casablanca
French female handball players
Olympic handball players of France
Handball players at the 2000 Summer Olympics